These are the late night schedules on all three networks for each calendar season beginning September 1981. All times are Eastern/Pacific.

PBS is not included, as member television stations have local flexibility over most of their schedules and broadcast times for network shows may vary, CBS and ABC are not included on the weekend schedules (as the networks do not offer late night programs of any kind on weekends).

Talk/variety shows are highlighted in yellow, network news programs in gold, and local news & programs are highlighted in white background.

Monday-Friday

Saturday

Sunday

By network

ABC

Returning Series
ABC Late Night
Fridays
Nightline

CBS

Returning Series
The CBS Late Movie

NBC

Returning Series
NBC Late Night Movie
Saturday Night Live
SCTV Network 90
Tomorrow Coast to Coast
The Tonight Show Starring Johnny Carson

New Series
NBC News Overnight
Late Night with David Letterman

Not Returning From 1980-81
The Midnight Special

United States late night network television schedules
1981 in American television
1982 in American television